Roberto Martín Rivas Tagliabúe (born 14 March 1992) is a Uruguayan footballer who plays as a defender for Liverpool F.C. in the Uruguayan Primera División.

References

External links
Profile at ESPN FC

1992 births
Living people
Montevideo Wanderers F.C. players
Liverpool F.C. (Montevideo) players
Uruguayan Primera División players
Uruguayan footballers
Association football defenders